James MacArthur (1937–2010) was an American actor.

James MacArthur may also refer to:
 James Macarthur (bishop) (1848–1922), Anglican bishop
 James Macarthur (politician) (1798–1867), Australian pastoralist and politician

See also
 James McArthur (born 1987), Scottish football player
 James J. McArthur, Canadian surveyor and mountaineer
 Jim McArthur (born 1952), Scottish goalkeeper
 Jim McArthur (Australian footballer) (1870–1937), Australian rules footballer